In enzymology, a 2,6-dioxo-6-phenylhexa-3-enoate hydrolase is an enzyme that catalyzes the chemical reaction

2,6-dioxo-6-phenylhexa-3-enoate + H2O  benzoate + 2-oxopent-4-enoate

Thus, the two substrates of this enzyme are 2,6-dioxo-6-phenylhexa-3-enoate and H2O, whereas its two products are benzoate and 2-oxopent-4-enoate.

This enzyme belongs to the family of hydrolases, specifically those acting on carbon-carbon bonds in ketonic substances.  The systematic name of this enzyme class is 2,6-dioxo-6-phenylhexa-3-enoate benzoylhydrolase. This enzyme is also called HOHPDA hydrolase.  This enzyme participates in biphenyl degradation and fluorene degradation.

Structural studies

References

 

EC 3.7.1
Enzymes of known structure